Tenor Legacy is an album by the American jazz saxophonist Joe Lovano, recorded in 1993 and released on the Blue Note label.

Reception
The AllMusic review by Scott Yanow stated: "Lovano has created a set with a great deal of variety and some surprising moments".

Track listing
All compositions by Joe Lovano except as indicated
 "Miss Etna" - 6:30 
 "Love Is a Many Splendored Thing" (Sammy Fain, Paul Francis Webster) - 6:44 
 "Blackwell's Message" - 5:36 
 "Laura" (Johnny Mercer, David Raksin) - 4:31 
 "Introspection" (Thelonious Monk) - 9:05 
 "In the Land of Ephesus" - 6:58 
 "To Her Ladyship" (Billy Frazier) - 9:03 
 "Web of Fire" - 5:51 
 "Rounder's Mood" (Booker Little) - 8:20 
 "Bread and Wine" - 3:31

Personnel
Joe Lovano – tenor saxophone
Joshua Redman - tenor saxophone
Mulgrew Miller – piano
Christian McBride – bass
Don Alias - percussion
Lewis Nash – drums

References

External links
 

Blue Note Records albums
Joe Lovano albums
1993 albums